Making Love is a 1982 American drama film.

Making Love may also refer to:
 "Making Love" (song), the theme song to the 1982 film, performed by Roberta Flack
 Making Love ... The Very Best of Air Supply, a 1983 album by Air Supply
 Making Love (album), a 1999 album by Atom and His Package
 Making Love – A Conspiracy of the Heart, a 2003 comic novel
 A euphemism for sexual intercourse
 "Makin' Love", a song by Kiss from Rock and Roll Over
 "Making Love", a song by Hikaru Utada from Ultra Blue
 "Making Love", a song by Yngwie Malmsteen from Eclipse

See also
 "Make Love", a song by Keri Hilson
 "Make Love", a song by Faith Evans from Incomparable
 "Make Love" (Gucci Mane song), a song by Gucci Mane and Nicki Minaj from the album Mr. Davis (2017)
 "Making Love Out of Nothing at All", a song by Air Supply, also covered by Bonnie Tyler
 Sex (disambiguation)